Gerard Bouwhuis (born 1954, Castricum) is a Dutch pianist, best known for his work on contemporary music. A graduate from the Royal Conservatory of The Hague under Geoffrey Douglas Madge, he is a member of the Xenakis Ensemble. Composers such as Louis Andriessen, Cornelis de Bondt and Martijn Padding have written works for him.

References

  Centre for New Zealand music
  Muziek-Podium Zeeland

1954 births
Living people
Dutch classical pianists
Royal Conservatory of The Hague alumni
People from Castricum
21st-century classical pianists